USS LST-564 was a United States Navy  in commission from 1944 to 1946.

Construction and commissioning
LST-564 was laid down on 5 March 1944 at Evansville, Indiana, by the Missouri Valley Bridge and Iron Company. She was launched on 4 May 1944, sponsored by Mrs. Frances Cassaday, and commissioned on 25 May 1944.

Service history
During World War II, LST-564 was assigned to the Pacific Theater of Operations. She took part in the Philippines campaign, participating in the landings on Leyte in October 1944. She then took part in the invasion and occupation of Okinawa from April to June 1945.

Following the war, LST-564 performed occupation duty in the Far East until early November 1945, when she departed for the United States.

Decommissioning and disposal
After returning to the United States, LST-564 was decommissioned on 8 March 1946 and stricken from the Navy List on 1 May 1946. On 31 December 1948, she was sold to Brown & Root, Inc. of Houston, Texas.

Honors and awards
LST-564 earned two battle stars for her World War II service.

References

NavSource Online: Amphibious Photo Archive LST-564

 

LST-542-class tank landing ships
World War II amphibious warfare vessels of the United States
Ships built in Evansville, Indiana
1944 ships